Angata, full name María Angata Veri Tahi ʻa Pengo Hare Koho ( – December 1914) was a Roman Catholic Rapa Nui religious leader from Easter Island during the late 19th and early 20th century. After experiencing a prophetic vision in which God instructed her to retake the land and livestock, she led an unsuccessful rebellion on the island against the Williamson-Balfour Company, intending to create a theocracy centered on Roman Catholicism and Rapa Nui spiritual values.

Conversion
Angata was born around 1853 into the Miru clan. Between 1864 and 1866, the French Picpus missionaries established themselves on Easter Island and converted many of the Rapa Nui people to Christianity during a period of severe population collapse caused by Peruvian slave raiding and the introduction of European diseases.

In 1871, Angata and her first husband, Daniel Manu Heu Roroa, travelled to Mangareva in the Gambier Islands with Father Hippolyte Roussel. She had two children from this marriage. Her husband reportedly beat her so severely that it caused her to become permanently hunchbacked. Her cousins killed him in retaliation for the abuse.

On Mangareva, she began learning the Christian scriptures by heart. Father Roussel trained her to become a catechist or lay teacher for the new Congregation of the Sacred Hearts of Jesus and Mary.

Return to Easter Island

When Angata returned to Easter Island in October 1879, she worked as co-catechist and assistant to Nicolás Pakarati and Pakomīo Māʻori Ure Kino (c. 1816/1836–1908/1909), whom she had married on Mangareva. They became the island's principal spiritual leaders in the absence of a resident missionary. Angata and her second husband had six children together. The children supposedly inherited European Basque features from their father, despite Angata and Pakomio claiming full-blood Rapa Nui descent.

In 1892, Angata organized many of the women on the island to support her cousin Siméon Riro Kāinga (both were members of the Miru clan) for the position of ‘Ariki or King of Rapa Nui against the rival claimant Enrique Ika, also a Miru. The position was left vacant by the death of Atamu Tekena, who had ceded the island to Chile in 1888. It has been argued that he was elected mainly because of his good looks, but a significant part of his success was also due Angata's strong influence with the people.

Riro unsuccessfully attempted to reclaim indigenous sovereignty in the absence of direct Chilean control from 1892 to 1896. However, Chile reasserted its claim, and the island was later leased to Enrique Merlet and his ranching company. They restricted the islanders' access to most of their land except a walled-off settlement at Hanga Roa, which they were not allowed to leave without permission. The young king attempted to protest the company's abuse but died under suspicious circumstances at Valparaíso.

1914 rebellion
Merlet's manager outlawed the native kingship on the island, although Enrique Ika and Moisés Tuʻu Hereveri were briefly elected kings. Angata would assume nominal leadership of the Miru clan and lead the opposition to the company's control. The Williamson-Balfour Company later took control of the ranch from Merlet and continued the mistreatment of the Rapa Nui people. In 1914, Angata had a prophetic vision that Merlet was dead. This inspired her to lead an unsuccessful rebellion against the company, stating that God wanted the islanders to retake the island, kill the ranch's livestock, and have a feast. On 30 June 1914, she sent her son-in-law Daniera Maria Teave Haukena to the company manager Henry Percy Edmunds with a declaration that the natives intended to retake the land and livestock from the company.

The rebellion was crushed on 5 August when the Chilean naval vessel Baquedano arrived and arrested four of the ringleaders. Comandante Almanzor Hernández declared that the Rapa Nui had been "fully justified in doing everything they had done". He later commented he was glad they had not murdered Edmunds. None of the natives were punished, and three of the imprisoned leaders were released but her son-in-law Daniera was deported from the island.

The rebellion, which was intended to establish a kingdom of God based on Rapa Nui understandings, had the negative effect of provoking the Chilean government into imposing a stronger administration. A separate colonial official (not affiliated to the company) was appointed. The island was opened to immigration from the mainland, decreasing the influence of the native islanders.

Despite these changes, the independence movement has continued on the island to the present day. The walls confining the Rapa Nui to Hanga Roa were torn down in 1966.

During the Mana Expedition to Easter Island in 1914, the English anthropologist Katherine Routledge met and spoke with Angata at the height of her rebellion. Routledge tried to dissuade the "prophetess" as she referred to her, and her people, from continuing their raids and killing the island's livestock. She describes Angata during their interview:

Angata died in December 1914, months after her meeting with Routledge. Her funeral on 29 January 1915 was attended by the English anthropologist. She was buried at the cemetery of Holy Cross Church, Hanga Roa, next to other early Catholic missionaries: Eugène Eyraud, Nicolás Pakarati, and Sebastian Englert.

See also
History of Easter Island

References

Bibliography

Rapanui people
History of Easter Island
1850s births
1914 deaths
Converts to Roman Catholicism
Roman Catholic missionaries in Easter Island